Loparskaya is a rural locality (a railway station) in Pushnovsky Territorial Okrug of Kolsky District of Murmansk Oblast, Russia, located on the Kola Peninsula beyond the Arctic Circle at a height of  above sea level. Population: 173 (2010 Census).

Notable people
 Jelena Porsanger (born 1967) is a Russian Sami ethnographer and university rector

References

Notes

Sources

Rural localities in Murmansk Oblast